Tihomir 'Rudi' Rudež (born 14 July 1963) is a Croatian retired footballer who played as a striker.

External links

1963 births
Living people
Sportspeople from Osijek
Association football forwards
Yugoslav footballers
Croatian footballers
NK Osijek players
NK Iskra Bugojno players
HNK Cibalia players
G.D. Chaves players
F.C. Paços de Ferreira players
S.C. Campomaiorense players
C.D. Nacional players
C.F. União de Lamas players
Yugoslav First League players
Primeira Liga players
Liga Portugal 2 players
Croatian expatriate footballers
Expatriate footballers in Portugal
Croatian expatriate sportspeople in Portugal